Tell It to the Bees is a 2018 British romantic drama film directed by Annabel Jankel and starring Anna Paquin and Holliday Grainger. The screenplay by Henrietta and Jessica Ashworth is based on the 2009 novel of the same name by Fiona Shaw.

The film had its world premiere at the Toronto International Film Festival as a Special Presentation on 9 September 2018. Tell It to the Bees opened in limited release in the United States on 3 May 2019. It was released theatrically in the United Kingdom on 26 July 2019.

Plot
With her failing marriage and young son, Lydia (Grainger) starts to connect with the town's new doctor Jean (Paquin), who bonds with Lydia's son Charlie after he takes an interest in her bee colonies. However, in 1950s rural Scotland, the women's relationship raises questions after the mother and son start to live with her after they get evicted.

Cast

 Anna Paquin as Jean Markham
 Holliday Grainger as Lydia Weekes
 Emun Elliott as Robert Weekes
 Lauren Lyle as Annie Cranmer
 Gregor Selkirk as Charlie Weekes
 Billy Boyd as adult Charlie vocal narrator 
 Kate Dickie as Pam Cranmer
 Steven Robertson as Jim

Production

Development
In June 2012, the original screenplay written by Irena Brignull was presented to the British Film Institute (BFI). Funding for the project was thereafter secured from the BFI Film Fund and Creative Scotland. The initial production budget in 2015 was £5 million.

In May 2017, the producers announced that Holliday Grainger was to star in the film. In August 2017, Anna Paquin joined the cast as Doctor Jean Markham. Unlike the novel, which is set in Yorkshire, the film takes place in southern Scotland.

Tell It to the Bees is produced by Reliance Entertainment Productions 8, Archface Films, Taking A Line For A Walk, Riverstone Pictures, Cayenne Film Company, Motion Picture Capital; and co-produced by Filmgate Films, Twickenham Studios and Film i Väst. Film Constellation handled international distribution rights.

The North American rights were acquired from Film Constellation by Good Deed Entertainment on 30 October 2018. Distribution rights for Germany, Spain, Korea, and Taiwan were sold on 4 November 2018, followed by rights to Australia, New Zealand, Scandinavia, and Poland on 7 February 2019, as well as acquisition by Vertigo Releasing for the United Kingdom.

Filming
Principal photography began on 10 August 2017 in Scotland, with filming near Stirling.

Soundtrack

The original score was written by Scottish composer Claire M Singer. The soundtrack album was released on 3 May 2019.

Release

Tell It to the Bees premiered at the Toronto International Film Festival on 9 September 2018. The first movie clip was released on 6 September in advance of the world premiere.

It premiered in limited theatrical release in the U.S. on 3 May 2019.

Home media
In the U.S., the film was made available as VOD on 3 May 2019.

Reception

Critical response
The website's critical consensus reads, "Tell It to the Bees is well-acted and well-intentioned — but often undermined by its frustratingly didactic storytelling." On Metacritic, the film received a score of 50/100 based on 13 reviews from critics, indicating "mixed or average reviews".

References

Further reading

External links
  Official website at Good Deed Entertainment
 
  Tell It to the Bees at Film Constellation
 
   Tell It to the Bees at British Council  Film

2018 films
2018 LGBT-related films
2018 romantic drama films
British independent films
British LGBT-related films
British romantic drama films
Films based on British novels
Films based on romance novels
Films set in the 1950s
British historical romance films
Lesbian-related films
LGBT-related romantic drama films
Reliance Entertainment films
2018 independent films
Films directed by Annabel Jankel
2010s English-language films
2010s British films